Party is a 2006 Indian Telugu-language film, directed by Ravi Babu in the genre of comedy that makes a statement on the corporate environment shaping the IT world in the new millennium. It stars Allari Naresh, Shashank, Ravi Babu and Madhu Sharma. The plot of the film is heavily inspired from the Hollywood film Weekend at Bernie's.

Plot 
The story is about two college buddies Nani (Allari Naresh) and Bujji (Shashank) who get into trouble with a local don (Surya) and need to pay him a crore of rupees to get out of the situation. Meanwhile, a  software firm (named Underware Hardware and Software Company!) headed by Dr. Rajendra Prasad (Brahmanandam) is facing a hostile take over by another firm. Rajendra Prasad had to build the world's fastest supercomputer in time to halt the takeover. But the rival firm sabotage his invention. Rajendra Prasad had no option but to sell his company to his rival, but decides not to and explores more options. Meanwhile, Nani and Bujji worm their way into Rajendra Prasad's company promising to give him the technology for a talking computer (named Bujji Babu 007) that would bring him the much needed millions. But Rajendra Prasad is assassinated while in their company. Fearing that fingers would point to them, they hide his body. A look alike takes Rajendra Prasad's place and tries to sell the company as quickly as possible so that he would get the interest of ₹20 crores. Rajendra Prasad's daughter Madhu (Madhu Sharma), meanwhile, falls in love with Nani. What follows is a series of anecdotes that lead to the unraveling of the mystery of the killer of the original Rajendra Prasad and preventing the rival company Wonderware from taking over Underware thus keeping to the wish of the original Rajendra Prasad.

The plot moves with interesting references to the world of computers with names borrowed from the terminology used by geeks in the IT campuses, like Microchip and Potato chip are the code names used by two employees (Ravi Prakash and his assistant) to sabotage the work of the company run by Rajendra Prasad. The role of a professional killer is played by Ravi Babu who kills only humans and not animals. But to his bad luck he ends up killing animals, accidentally, every time he tries to kill someone and is heart broken. This is a slapstick comedy with many inter-connected sub-plots that keep complicating the plot and adding to its hilarity. Lots of corporate espionage, sabotage, comedy and romance with a happy ending – that is the story of ‘Party’.

Cast 
 Allari Naresh as Nani
 Shashank as Bujji
 Madhu Sharma as Madhu
 Brahmanandam as Dr. Rajendra Prasad / John Abraham
 Ravi Babu as James
 Ravi Prakash as Mr. Berde
 Nuthan Kumar as Ramu
 Surya as Velu Anna
 Chalapathi Rao as CID Officer
 Krishnudu as doctor
 M.S. Narayana as John Abraham (picture)
 Venu Madhav as Photographer
 Krishna Bhagawan in guest appearance
 Vijay Sai as Lab Incharge

Music 

Music for this film was composed by Chakri. The Lyrics are written by Bhaskarabhatla and Ravikumar. All songs were well picturised and got positive response.

References

External links

Films directed by Ravi Babu
2000s Telugu-language films
Films scored by Chakri